Studies in American Indian Literatures is a biannual peer-reviewed academic journal covering Native American literature. It is published by the University of Nebraska Press on behalf of the Association for the Study of American Indian Literatures.

History 
The journal was established in 1977 as the Newsletter of the Association for the Study of American Indian Literatures and changed to ASAIL Newsletter in 1978 before the journal obtained its current title in 1980. Publication was interrupted from 1987 to 1989.

Abstracting and indexing 
The journal is abstracted and indexed in the Arts and Humanities Citation Index, Current Contents/Arts & Humanities, and Scopus.

References

External links 
 

Literary magazines published in the United States
American studies journals
English-language journals
Native American literature
Publications established in 1977
Biannual journals
University of Nebraska–Lincoln